Chongqing Blues is a 2010 Chinese drama film directed by Wang Xiaoshuai. It was selected for the main competition at the 2010 Cannes Film Festival.

Plot
Lin Quanhai, a sea captain and father, returns from a six-month journey and is informed that his 25-year-old son Lin Bo has been shot by the police. In finding out what happened, he comes to realize that he knew little of his son. He starts journeying back to Chongqing, a city where he once lived. He begins to understand the effect that his repeated absence had on his son's life.

Cast
 Wang Xueqi as Lin Quanhai, the father
Fan Bingbing as Zhu Qing
 Qin Hao as Xiao Hao, the friend
 Zi Yi as Lin Bo, the son
 Li Feier as Xiao Wen, the girlfriend

References

External links
 
 Cannes press kit

2010 films
2010 in China
2010 drama films
2010s Mandarin-language films
Films directed by Wang Xiaoshuai
Films set in Chongqing
Chinese drama films